Ernest Bernard Jackson, Jr (born October 9, 1986) is an American former professional gridiron football player who was a wide receiver. He played college football at the University at Buffalo, The State University of New York and attended Gates Chili High School in Rochester, New York. He played professionally for the Erie Explosion of the Ultimate Indoor Football League, the Chicago Slaughter of the Indoor Football League, and the BC Lions, Ottawa Redblacks, and Montreal Alouettes of the Canadian Football League (CFL).

Professional career

BC Lions 
Ernest Jackson had a breakout season with the BC Lions in 2014 and was named CFL Offensive Player of the Month for October of the 2014 season.

Ottawa Redblacks 
On February 10, 2015 Jackson signed with the Ottawa Redblacks. the Redblacks were coming off their inaugural season in which their receiving corps struggled mightily. In his first two seasons in Ottawa, Jackson played  a major role in the offense; he was named the East Division finalist for Most Outstanding Player of the year award following the 2016 regular season. Jackson finished the season with ten receiving touchdowns, tied for the second-most in the league. In the 2016 Grey Cup, Jackson scored the game-winning touchdown in overtime against the Calgary Stampeders. Following the 2016 season he was not re-signed by the Redblacks and became a free-agent.

Montreal Alouettes 
Jackson was considered one of the best free agent wide receivers and signed a two-year contract with the Montreal Alouettes (CFL) on February 16, 2017. In two seasons, Jackson never missed a game, and put up 112 catches for 1,409 yards and 7 majors, while the Alouettes struggled with records of 3–15 in 2017 and 5–13 in 2018. In January 2019, he signed a contract extension with Montreal. He was released just prior to training camp for the 2019 season on May 19, 2019.

Career statistics

References

External links
CFL profile
Just Sports Stats
College stats
Ottawa Redblacks bio 
BC Lions profile
NFL Draft Scout

1986 births
Living people
African-American players of American football
African-American players of Canadian football
American football wide receivers
BC Lions players
Buffalo Bulls football players
Canadian football wide receivers
Chicago Slaughter players
Erie Explosion players
Ottawa Redblacks players
Players of American football from New York (state)
Sportspeople from Rochester, New York
Montreal Alouettes players
21st-century African-American sportspeople
20th-century African-American people